ASP – America’s Swimming Pool Company is a franchised swimming pool service chain, specializing in swimming pool maintenance, repair, and renovation. Stewart Vernon founded the first ASP - America's Swimming Pool Company in 2001 in Macon, Georgia, where the franchise headquarters currently resides.

History 

Stewart Vernon, founder & CEO of ASP – America’s Swimming Pool Company, opened his first swimming pool service company in Macon, GA in 2001. Through an apprenticeship with a local pool service expert who was preparing to retire, Vernon learned the industry inside and out. He purchased service equipment and a truck, and began working as an owner/operator. By age 22, Vernon had successfully launched the first ASP.

As his individual business grew, Vernon was presented with the concept of changing his business model into a franchise, offering the ability to expand the brand across the nation. After researching the franchise concept, Vernon founded ASP Franchising and began selling franchises in 2006.

Growth 

Over 15 years, the company has grown to 82 locations serving 200 territories, in 20 states. As of 2015, each of the 82 franchises is individually owned and operated.

Vernon began franchising the business in 2006, detailed below is a total of the number of franchise owners that have joined the company over the years:

Awards and recognition 

Since the launch of the first franchises in 2006, ASP has received multiple awards and recognitions, including, but not limited to, the following:
 Top 100 Fastest Growing Franchise - #98, 2015 Entrepreneur Magazine
 Top Home Based Franchise - 2014 Franchise 500, #53
 Top Low Cost Franchise - 2014 Franchise 500, #37
 Top Franchise Opportunity for 2015 - 2015 Franchise Business Review
 Top Franchisee Satisfaction - 2015 Franchise Business Review Survey
 International Franchise Association - Member in Good Standing
 VetFran - Member in Good Standing
 The Association of Pool & Spa Professionals - Member in Good Standing

References

External links 
 ASP - America's Swimming Pool Company (Company Website)
 ASP Franchising, LLC (Corporate Website)
 ASP – America’s Swimming Pool Company Locations Page (Franchise Locations page)

Franchises
American companies established in 2001
Business services companies established in 2001
Business services companies of the United States
Companies based in Macon, Georgia